Mah Khatuni or Mah Khatooni may refer to:
 Mah Khatuni, Hormozgan